The 1970 Oregon State Beavers football team represented Oregon State University in the Pacific-8 Conference (Pac-8) during the 1970 NCAA University Division football season.  In their sixth season under head coach Dee Andros, the Beavers compiled a 6–5 record (3–4 in Pac-8, tied for sixth), and were outscored 239 to 211.  They played five home games on campus at Parker Stadium in Corvallis, with one at Civic Stadium in Portland.

The Beavers defeated rival Oregon in the Civil War game for the seventh straight year. This was Oregon State's fifth-straight winning season, but the next was decades away, in 1999.

Schedule

Roster
Steve Brown, So. (defense)
DL Craig Hanneman, Sr. (C)
C Erin Haynes

References

External links
 Game program: Oregon State vs. Washington State at Spokane – November 14, 1970

Oregon State
Oregon State Beavers football seasons
Oregon State Beavers football